Paul-Anders Simma (born 27 September 1959) is a Finnish Sámi film director and screenwriter. His 1997 film The Minister of State was entered into the 20th Moscow International Film Festival.

Selected filmography
 The Minister of State (1997)
 Give Us Our Skeletons (1999)

References

External links

1959 births
Living people
People from Enontekiö
Finnish Sámi people
Finnish film directors
Finnish screenwriters